A synanthrope (from the Greek σύν syn, "together with" + ἄνθρωπος anthropos, "man") is an organism that lives near and benefits from humans and their  environmental modifications (see anthropophilia).  

Common synanthrope habitats include houses, gardens, farms, parks, roadsides and rubbish dumps. 

The term synanthrope includes many species regarded as pests or weeds, but does not include domesticated animals.

Examples of synanthropes are various insect species (ants, lice, silverfish, cockroaches, etc.), house sparrows, rock doves (pigeons), crows, various rodent species, Virginia opossums, raccoons, certain monkey species, coyotes, deer, passerines, and other urban wildlife. Plants include Pineapple Weed, Dandelion, Chicory, and Plantain. 

The brown rat is counted as one of the most prominent synanthropic animals and can be found in almost every place there are people.

Botany
In plants, synanthropes are classified into two main types - apophytes and anthropophytes.

Apophytes are synanthropic species that are native in origin. They can be subdivided into the following:
Cultigen apophytes – spread by cultivation methods
Ruderal apophytes – spread by development of marginal areas
Pyrophyte apophytes – spread by fires
Zoogen apophytes – spread by grazing animals
Substitution apophytes – spread by logging or voluntary extension

Anthropophytes are synanthropic species of foreign origin, whether introduced voluntarily or involuntarily. They can be subdivided into the following:
Archaeophytes – introduced before the end of the 15th century
Kenophytes – introduced after the 15th century
Ephemerophytes – anthropophytic plants that appear episodically
Subspontaneous – voluntarily introduced plants that have escaped cultivation and survived in the wild without further human intervention for a certain period.
Adventive – involuntarily introduced plants that have escaped cultivation and survived in the wild without further human intervention for a certain period.
Naturalized or Neophytes – involuntarily introduced plants that now appear to thrive along with the native flora indefinitely.

See also
Urban wildlife
Satoyama
Commensalism

References

External links
The Synanthrope Preserve

Ecology terminology